Gods of Thunder: A Norwegian Tribute to Kiss is a Norwegian compilation album by various artists. The album is a tribute to the American hard rock band Kiss.

Album art
The album art on the album was designed by Ken Kelly, who designed various 1970s Kiss album covers, including Love Gun and Destroyer.

Track listing

References

External links
 Gods of Thunder: A Norwegian Tribute to Kiss On Amazon

Heavy metal albums by Norwegian artists
Kiss (band) tribute albums
2006 compilation albums
Compilation albums by Norwegian artists
Heavy metal compilation albums
Albums with cover art by Ken Kelly (artist)